Kibdelosporangium metalli is a Gram-positive bacterium from the genus Kibdelosporangium which has been isolated from an earth mine in Bayan Obo, China.

References

External links
Type strain of Kibdelosporangium metalli at BacDive -  the Bacterial Diversity Metadatabase

Pseudonocardiales
Bacteria described in 2017